The Moose River is a  tributary of Thief Lake in northwestern Minnesota, the United States.  The outflow from Thief Lake drains via the Thief River, Red Lake River, Red River of the North, Lake Winnipeg, and the Nelson River to Hudson Bay.

See also
List of rivers of Minnesota

References

Minnesota Watersheds

USGS Hydrologic Unit Map - State of Minnesota (1974)

Rivers of Beltrami County, Minnesota
Rivers of Marshall County, Minnesota
Rivers of Minnesota
Tributaries of Hudson Bay